Strotarchus piscatorius is a species of true spiders in the family Cheiracanthiidae. It is found in the USA and Mexico.

References

 Bradley, Richard A. (2012). Common Spiders of North America. University of California Press.
 Ubick, Darrell (2005). Spiders of North America: An Identification Manual. American Arachnological Society.

External links

 NCBI Taxonomy Browser, Strotarchus piscatorius

Cheiracanthiidae
Spiders described in 1847